Ahmed al-Hiba (also known as The Blue Sultan; 9 September 1877 – 26 June 1919), was a leader of an armed resistance to the French colonial power in southern Morocco, and pretender to the sultanate of Morocco. In English texts he is usually named simply El Hiba. In addition to his revolutionary activity, Ahmed al-Hiba was a prolific poet.

Biography 
He was the son of Ma al-'Aynayn, a religious leader of the Sahara. His father was appointed caid of Tindouf in 1887, by the Moroccan sultan Hassan I. Ma al-'Aynayn led an armed uprising against the French in the first decade of the twentieth century, and died in 1910 in Tiznit. Shortly after his death, in 1912 the French imposed the Treaty of Fez on the Moroccans and took virtual control of the country. Ma al-'Aynayn's son al-Hiba then decided that this effectively vacated the position of Sultan of Morocco, and proclaimed himself Sultan at Tiznit (Morocco) as his father had done before him.

A general uprising in the south of Morocco saw al-Hiba recognized as Sultan in Taroudannt, Agadir and the Dades and Draa regions. He gained a powerful ally in Si Madani, head of the Glaoua family. With his tribal army he entered Marrakech on 18 August 1912 and was proclaimed Sultan there also.

The decisive Battle of Sidi Bou Othman with the French took place near Marrakech on 6 September 1912. al-Hiba's forces were defeated by the French commanded by Charles Mangin, with the loss of some 2,000 tribal warriors. In January 1913, the Glaoua family, now allied with the French, drove al-Hiba back to the Sous.

al-Hiba did not give up the struggle and continued to harass the French in his own area until his death on 23 June 1919 in Kerdous Anti-Atlas. Since then his struggle was carried on by his brother Merebbi Rebbu.

External links 

 José Ramón Diego Aguirre, El Oscuro Pasado del Desierto. Approximación a la Historia del Sáhara. Casa de África, Madrid, 2004. .

References

1875 births
1919 deaths
Pretenders to the throne of Morocco
19th-century Moroccan people
Moroccan politicians
Place of birth missing
Moroccan Sunni Muslims
20th-century Moroccan people